Krylatskoye Ice Palace is an indoor ice arena for speed skating and bandy located in Krylatskoye District, Moscow, Russia. It is the home of  Dynamo Moscow bandy club.

External links
 Official site
 Indoor picture

References

Bandy venues in Russia
Sports venues in Moscow
Sports venue
Bandy World Championships stadiums
Indoor speed skating venues